Yakubovka is a rural locality (a selo) in Buturlinsky District in Nizhny Novgorod Oblast. Population: 384 inhabitants (2010). The distance to the town Buturlino is about 30 km.

References

Notes

Rural localities in Nizhny Novgorod Oblast